Laleia, officially Laleia Administrative Post, is an administrative post (and was formerly a subdistrict) in Manatuto municipality, East Timor.

Born
 Xanana Gusmão (1946), former president and prime minister of East Timor

References

External links 

  – information page on Ministry of State Administration site 

Administrative posts of East Timor
Manatuto Municipality